Below are the squads for the 2015 AFF Women's Championship, hosted by Vietnam, which is took place between 1–10 May 2015.

Group A

Australia U20
Head coach: Ante Juric

Indonesia
Head coach: Rully Nere

Laos
Head coach: Kovanh Namthavixay

Thailand
Head coach: Nuengrutai Srathongvian

Group B

Malaysia
Head coach: Asyraaf Abdullah

Myanmar
Head coach: Daw Thet Thet Win.

Philippines
Head coach: Buda Bautista

Vietnam
Head coach:  Takashi Norimatsu

References

Women's AFF Championship squads
2015 in women's association football